Valentino Martin Pascucci (born November 17, 1978) is an American former professional baseball player. He played parts of two major league seasons with the Montreal Expos and New York Mets. He batted and threw right-handed. In 2014, he transitioned to the role of hitting coach for the Mets Single A affiliate, the Savannah Sand Gnats. In 2016, he was named the hitting coach for the St. Lucie Mets.

Career

High school
Pascucci attended  Gahr High School in Cerritos, CA.

College
Pascucci was originally drafted by the Milwaukee Brewers in the 11th round of the 1996 Major League Baseball draft, but he chose to go to college instead. He attended college at the University of Oklahoma for two years, from –. He was originally a pitcher, compiling a 4-0 win-loss record with two saves and 64 strikeouts in 58 innings pitched.

Montreal Expos
The Montréal Expos selected him in the 15th round of the 1999 Major League Baseball draft. He began his professional career as a position player.

In , with a 20-game stint with the Cape Fear Crocs, the Single-A affiliate of the Expos, Pascucci batted .319 with 3 home runs and 10 RBI and was called up to the High-A Jupiter Hammerheads later that season. He played 113 games for Jupiter, hitting .284 with a .394 on-base percentage. Val was promoted to the Double-A Harrisburg Senators for the  season, where he sent a minor league career high 27 home runs out of the park.

On April 26, 2004, Pascucci was called up by Montréal from Triple-A Edmonton. He debuted for the Expos in right field later that day. Pascucci, however, was sent back down to the minor leagues on May 28. Pascucci was not called back up to the Majors until September 1, when MLB rosters expanded. He hit his first career home run on September 15, 2004 and also played in the final game of the Expos' history on October 3. He was released on December 10, 2004.

Chiba Lotte Marines
Pascucci spent the 2005 and 2006 seasons with the Chiba Lotte Marines of Japan's Pacific League.

Florida Marlins
On April 6, Pascucci was signed by the Florida Marlins and spent the season with their Triple-A affiliate, the Albuquerque Isotopes.

Philadelphia Phillies
In December 2007, Pascucci signed a minor league contract with the Philadelphia Phillies' Triple-A affiliate, the Lehigh Valley IronPigs.

New York Mets
After being released by the Phillies on April 29, Pascucci signed a minor league contract with the New York Mets a few days later. He spent the rest of the season playing for the New Orleans Zephyrs, the Mets Triple-A affiliate. He became a free agent at the end of the season.

Los Angeles Dodgers
In January , he signed a minor league contract with the Los Angeles Dodgers. Pascucci hit only .207 with 8 home runs in 60 games with the AAA Albuquerque Isotopes before he was released by the Dodgers on June 18, 2009.

San Diego Padres
He was signed by the San Diego Padres on June 27 and assigned to their AAA club, the Portland Beavers.

New York Mets
On May 14, 2010, after a brief stint with the Camden Riversharks,  Pascucci signed a minor league deal with the New York Mets, and was assigned to the Triple-A Buffalo Bisons.

In 2011, he was called up when the rosters expanded on September 1, after hitting 21 home runs and driving in 91 RBIs with AAA Buffalo. He made his Mets debut on September 8, 2011 when he pinch hit for Willie Harris. He got a single against Atlanta Braves pitcher Eric O'Flaherty and was then pinch run for by Jason Pridie. After that, he went 0–5 with a main pinch-hitter role for the team, until on September 24, he hit a game tying pinch-hit home run in the 7th inning off of Philadelphia Phillies pitcher Cole Hamels to tie the game at 1. It was Pascucci's first pinch-hit home run and just the 3rd home run of his Major league career. Val's teammate and Mets third baseman David Wright then hit a go-ahead double in the 8th inning to give the Mets a 2–1 win over their rivals. On the very next day, Pasccuci hit a pinch-hit RBI single against Phillies pitcher Antonio Bastardo. That would be Pasccuci's last hit of the 2011 season. He made a mere two pinch-hit appearances in the Mets' last series of the season against the Cincinnati Reds. Pasccuci finished the 2011 season 3-11, good for a .273 batting average.

On November 17, 2011, the Mets announced that Pascucci would be invited to 2012 Major League spring training. He spent the 2012 season with the Buffalo Bisons. During the 2012 season, Pascucci got invited to the AAA All Star Game and Home Run Derby held in Buffalo NY. Pascucci won the Home Run Derby, energizing the home crowd. He became a minor league free agent after 2012 season.

Coaching career
For the 2014 and 2015 seasons, Pascucci served as the hitting coach for the Mets' Class-A affiliate Savannah Sand Gnats.

Pascucci was named as the hitting coach for the Binghamton Rumble Ponies of the New York Mets organization for the 2018 season.

References

External links

1978 births
Living people
Albuquerque Isotopes players
American expatriate baseball players in Canada
American expatriate baseball players in Japan
American expatriate baseball players in Mexico
American people of Italian descent
Baseball coaches from California
Baseball players from California
Broncos de Reynosa players
Buffalo Bisons (minor league) players
Camden Riversharks players
Cape Fear Crocs players
Chiba Lotte Marines players
Edmonton Trappers players
Harrisburg Senators players
Leones del Caracas players
American expatriate baseball players in Venezuela
Leones del Escogido players
American expatriate baseball players in the Dominican Republic
Major League Baseball first basemen
Major League Baseball left fielders
Major League Baseball right fielders
Mexican League baseball first basemen
Minor league baseball coaches
Montreal Expos players
New Orleans Zephyrs players
New York Mets players
Nippon Professional Baseball first basemen
Nippon Professional Baseball outfielders
Oklahoma Sooners baseball players
People from Bellflower, California
Portland Beavers players
Vermont Expos players
2006 World Baseball Classic players
2009 World Baseball Classic players
Rochester Honkers players